Kaempferia elegans, commonly known as the silver spot, is a shade-loving ginger that has 6" round leaves with three rows of silver spots arranged across them. It has small purple flowers.

Further reading

elegans